Fortuner ( Luck or Privilege) is a 2019 Indian Kannada-language romantic-family drama directed by Manjunath J Anivaarya who is making his directorial debut. The film is first venture by Golecha Films International helmed by Rajesh Golecha, Anand Golecha, Surendar Golecha and Vimal Golecha. Diganth, Sonu Gowda and Swathi Sharma are playing lead roles supported by Rajesh Nataranaga, Kalyani Raju, Vinayak Joshi, Naveen Krishna among many others.

Junior dramas 
Fortune translates to Luck or Privilege. Life is said to be meaningful only when we analyze, punish and omit our imperfections before it is pointed out by others. This transition in life forms the crux of the story. The romantic drama unfolds life's situations and the protagonist's adaptation to the scenario. Watch the complete film to know whose fortunes are going to change.

Cast
Diganth as Partha
Sonu Gowda as Anusha (Anu)
Ratan Ram as Guruswamy (Swamy)
Swathi Sharma as Sruthi
Rajesh Nataranga
Vinayak Joshi
Naveen Krishna
Kalyani Raju
Bala Rajwadi, Sitting MLA and Partha's father
M. S. NarasimhaMurthy
Pallavi Raju

Soundtrack

The film's score and soundtrack was composed by Poornachandra Tejaswi.

Reception

Critical response 

Vinay Lokesh of The Times of India scored the film at 3.5 out of 5 stars and says "Fortuner highlights the complexities in today's relationships and how the young generation reacts when their expectations fall short. Director J Anivaarya deserves credit for adopting a refreshing approach that strikes the right chord. Fortuner takes you on an emotional journey that doesn't have the regular tropes of commercial films"A Shardhha of Cinema Express scored the film at 2.5 out of 5 stars and says "Fortuner leaves us with a strong sense of déja-vu, and had there been better sync between the cast and crew, the result could have been a better picture."Arvind Shweta of The News Minute wrote "The film may have worked well if it was made a decade ago. But right now, it is difficult to convince the audience with such a weak script."

References

External links
 Fortuner on Facebook
Fortuner - Official Website 

2010s Kannada-language films
2019 romantic drama films
Indian romantic drama films
2019 directorial debut films
2019 films